André Simon (5 January 1920 – 11 July 2012) was a racing driver from France.

Complete Formula One World Championship results
(key)

* Indicates shared drive with Giuseppe Farina
† Indicates shared drive with Ottorino Volonterio

References

External links
Profile at grandprix.com
Profile at Motor Sport magazine database

1920 births
2012 deaths
Racing drivers from Paris
French racing drivers
French Formula One drivers
Gordini Formula One drivers
Ferrari Formula One drivers
Mercedes-Benz Formula One drivers
Maserati Formula One drivers
Scuderia Centro Sud Formula One drivers
European Formula Two Championship drivers
24 Hours of Le Mans drivers
World Sportscar Championship drivers

12 Hours of Reims drivers